Eros Ferreira Biondini (born Belo Horizonte, 20 May 1971) is a veterinarian, Roman Catholic singer, presenter and Brazilian politician.

Biography
Eros Biondini was born in 1971 in Belo Horizonte, Minas Gerais. He holds a bachelor's degree in veterinary medicine from the Federal University of Minas Gerais (UFMG) and a post-graduate lato sensu in the Legislative Branch from the Pontifical Catholic University of Minas Gerais. He is married to Adriana Biondini, with whom he has two children.

Eros is a member of the Catholic Charismatic Renewal and founder of the New World Mission. It is idealizer of "Christ is the Show", biggest catholic musical event of the country and of the program More Brazil of the TV Canção Nova, that presented during three years.

Political career
In 2006, Eros Biondini obtained 68.359 thousand votes and became deputy state by the state of Minas Gerais by PHS. In his state mandate he was vice-president of the Committees of Tourism, Industry, Commerce and Cooperativism and of Popular Participation of the Legislative Assembly of Minas Gerais.

In 2010, was elected federal deputy, by the PTB, obtaining 208,058 votes in the litigation. In the year of 2013, Biondini assumed the Secretary of Sports and the Youth of the State of Minas Gerais, during the government of Antônio Anastasia.

In 2014, was reelected Federal Deputy with 179,073 votes.

In the Chamber of Deputies, he was first vice-president of the permanent committees of Work, Administration and Public Service and Consumer Defense. He was also an alternate member of the Social Security and Family Commission. Biondini participated as alternate member of the Special Commission on Political Reform and the Commission on Climate Disasters, head of the CPI on Sexual Exploitation of Children and Adolescents, rapporteur of the Special Subcommittee on Monitoring, Oversight and Control of Telecommunications Services and also coordinated the Mixed Parliamentary Front in Defense of Therapeutic Communities and APACS.

In March 2016, Biondini changed from the PTB to the Republican Party of the Social Order (PROS) assuming the state presidency of the party.

Biondini voted in favor of the Impeachment of Dilma Rousseff. Later, he was favorable to the PEC of the Ceiling of the Public Expenditure. In April 2017 Biondini voted against the labor Reform. In August 2017 he voted in favor of the process in which it was requested to open investigation of the then President Michel Temer. Also in November of the same year, Biondini voted for the approval of PEC 181/15, that makes crime abortion.

In 2018, he was re-elected Federal Deputy with 157,394 votes.

Discography

with Banda Nova Aliança
 É Tempo (1998) 
 Viver Como Irmãos (1999) 
 Ao Vivo no Maracanãzinho (2000)

Solo career
 Tesouros (2002)
 Mundo Novo (2004)
 Minha História (2006)
 Tempo da Graça (2008)
 Felicidade (2010)
 Marcas de Amor (2013)
 Ir Além (2017)

References

External links
 Official Site
 Eros Biondini on Facebook
 Eros Biondini on Instagram
 Eros Biondini on Twitter
 Profile in the Chamber of Deputies

1971 births
Living people
Members of the Legislative Assembly of Minas Gerais
Members of the Chamber of Deputies (Brazil) from Minas Gerais
Republican Party of the Social Order politicians
Brazilian Labour Party (current) politicians
Humanist Party of Solidarity politicians
Brazilian Roman Catholics
Brazilian Roman Catholic singers
People from Belo Horizonte